The United States ambassador to Grenada is the official representative of the government of the United States to the government of Grenada. The ambassador is the United States Ambassador to Barbados and the Eastern Caribbean, resident in Bridgetown, Barbados, and is concurrently the ambassador to Antigua and Barbuda, Barbados, Dominica, St. Kitts and Nevis, St. Lucia, and St. Vincent and the Grenadines.

The U.S. Government established an embassy in Grenada at St. George's on 2 February 1984. The U.S. Ambassador to Grenada is resident in Bridgetown, Barbados.

List of U.S. ambassadors to Grenada
The following is a list of U.S. ambassadors, or other chiefs of mission, to Grenada. The title given by the United States State Department to this position is currently Ambassador Extraordinary and Plenipotentiary.

See also
Grenada – United States relations
Foreign relations of Grenada
Ambassadors of the United States

References

 
United States Department of State: Background notes on Grenada

External links
 United States Department of State: Chiefs of Mission for Grenada
 United States Department of State: Grenada
 United States Embassy in Bridgetown

 01
Ambassadors of the United States
Grenada
Grenada